Ker-Chau Li is a Taiwanese statistician.

In 1975, Li graduated from National Taiwan University with a Bachelor of Science degree in mathematics. He then pursued graduate study in statistics at the University of California, Berkeley, completing a master's of science in 1979, followed by a doctorate in 1981. Li's doctoral dissertation, Contributions to Robust Design and Estimation Problems, was advised by Jack Kiefer. Li began his teaching career as an assistant professor in the statistics department of Purdue University, then joined the mathematics department of the University of California, Los Angeles in 1984. He was promoted to a full professorship in 1989, and transferred to the newly established UCLA statistics department in 1999. In 2009, Li was appointed a distinguished professor. In his native Taiwan, Li served as editor of the Statistica Sinica, and from 2006, served as director and distinguished research fellow of Academia Sinica's Institute of Statistical Science, stepping down from the former position in 2012.

Honors and awards
Li was elected a fellow of the Institute of Mathematical Statistics in 1989, awarded a Guggenheim Fellowship in 1993, and elected member of Academia Sinica and fellow of The World Academy of Sciences in 2012 and 2014, respectively.

References

Living people
Taiwanese statisticians
National Taiwan University alumni
University of California, Los Angeles faculty
University of California, Berkeley alumni
Members of Academia Sinica
Purdue University faculty
Year of birth missing (living people)
TWAS fellows
Fellows of the Institute of Mathematical Statistics
Mathematics journal editors
Mathematical statisticians